Victor Manuel Amela Bonilla, better known as Víctor Amela (Barcelona, 30 September 1960) is a Spanish writer and journalist present in several media. It is one of the co-creators of the section La contra at La Vanguardia, where he has published more than 1,800 interviews in 15 years.

Published books
 Jo hauria pogut salvar Lorca (2018) 
 La filla del capità groc (2016) Premi Ramon Llull 2016
 El cátaro imperfecto / El càtar imperfecte (2013)
 Casi todos mis secretos / Tots els meus secrets, o gairebé (2012)
 333 vitamines per a l'ànima (2012) (with Roser Amills)
 Grandes contras sobre el amor, Grandes contras sobre la mente humana, Grandes contras sobre la felicidad (2012) (with Ima Sanchís & Lluís Amiguet)
 Tombes i lletres
 Paraules d'amor, confessions apassionades (2011) (with Roser Amills)
 Antologia de citas (2010)
 Història cultural de l'audiovisual (2008)
 La televisió-espectacle (2008)
 Retratos y recuerdos de la vida forcallana (2006)
 Algunas cosas que he aprendido (2005)
 La meva ràdio (1993) theme book of the 10th anniversary of Catalunya Ràdio (co-author)

References

External links 
  

Journalists from Catalonia
Living people
1960 births
Writers from Barcelona